Centerville is an unincorporated community in Hempstead County, Arkansas, United States.

References

Unincorporated communities in Hempstead County, Arkansas
Unincorporated communities in Arkansas